Hans Wilsdorf (22 March 1881 – 6 July 1960) was a German businessman, best known as the founder of Rolex and Tudor. Wilsdorf's philosophy for the companies was 'Only great marketing is needed to make a company successful'

Early life

Hans Wilsdorf was born in Kulmbach, Germany, to Protestant parents, Anna and Johan Daniel Ferdinand Wilsdorf and was the second son of a family of three children.

His mother died when he was a boy and he became an orphan when his father died soon after when Hans was twelve years old.

Wilsdorf's fate was placed in the hands of his uncles who sold the prosperous family iron tools business which had belonged to his grandfather, and later to his father. Hans and his brother and sister were sent to excellent boarding schools where they received superb educations.

Wilsdorf published his autobiography in 1946 as part of a four volume set of books named Rolex Jubilee Vade Mecum. In his autobiography Hans said "Our uncles were not indifferent to our fate; nevertheless, the way in which they made me become self-reliant very early in life made me acquire the habit of looking after my possessions and, looking back, I believe that it is to this that much of my success is due".

Wilsdorf excelled in mathematics and languages, which inspired him to travel and work in foreign countries. Hans began his career as an apprentice with an influential international pearl exporting company. The experience Hans gained played a crucial role in of his future dealings.

In 1900 Wilsdorf began his career in Swiss watchmaking when he moved to La Chaux-de-Fonds to work as an English correspondent and clerk with the watch firm of Messrs. Cuno Korten, at the 49, rue Leoppold Robert, where he was paid a salary of 80 Swiss Francs. At the time, Cuno Korten exported around one million francs worth of pocket watches annually. Cuno Korten worked with all grades of watches, and manufactured a small number of watches from the ground up.

Wilsdorf was responsible for winding hundreds of pocket watches daily in his role with Cuno Korten, as well as verifying that all watches were accurate. Wilsdorf gained tremendous insight into watchmaking during his time with Cuno Korten, where he gained valuable knowledge about how all types of watches were produced.

1905: Founding Wilsdorf & Davis

In 1903 Hans Wilsdorf moved to London, England where he went to work for another high-quality watchmaking company. In 1905—with a modest amount of money—Hans set up a business with Alfred Davis named Wilsdorf & Davis, located at 83 Hatton Garden in London. The goal of Wilsdorf & Davis was to provide high-quality timepieces at affordable prices.

1908: Founding Rolex

On Rolex's 50th anniversary, in 1958, Wilsdorf shared the story of how he originally conceived the 'Rolex' name in 1908:

"I tried combining the letters of the alphabet in every possible way. This gave some hundred names, but none of them felt quite right. It was one morning when I was sitting on the upper level of a double-decker powered at that time by horses, driving along Cheapside in London, that a good genie whispered in my ear: "Rolex." A few days after this fruitful journey, the Rolex brand was filed, and then officially registered in Switzerland by Wilsdorf & Davis."

During the first decade of the 1900s pocket watches were ubiquitous, and wrist watches, referred to at the time as a "wristlet" were frowned upon. Hans Wilsdorf was an early believer in the potential of the wrist watch, and made it his mission in life to popularize them.

In 1902, during his stay at La Chaux-de-Fonds, Hans Wilsdorf heard of one Hermann Aegler, based in Bienne, Switzerland, who had begun producing 'ebauches', which are the rough movements for high-quality, small lever escapement watch movements.

In 1905, Wilsdorf traveled to Bienne, Switzerland and placed an order with Hermann Aegler, resulting in the largest order ever made for wristlet watches. This was the beginning of a long-standing partnership between Aegler and Rolex, until a century later when Rolex bought Aegler.

World War I

In 1914, a decade after Wilsdorf moved to London, World War I broke out, at which time Wilsdorf changed the name of Wilsdorf & Davis to The Rolex Watch Company Ltd. Fourteen days before World War I began, On July 14, 1914, Rolex was the first wristwatch in history to be awarded a Class "A" certificate from the Kew Observatory. Rolex had grown quickly; in 1914 they had more than 40 employees.

In 1914, Wilsdorf wrote: "My personal opinion ... is that pocket watches will almost completely disappear and that wrist watches will replace them definitively! I am not mistaken in this opinion and you will see that I am right".

In 1915 the British government implemented a 33% customs duty that prompted Rolex to move its international headquarters from London to Bienne, Switzerland. In 1919 Rolex moved its headquarters to Geneva, Switzerland, where it remains to this day.

1927: The Rolex Oyster

In 1927 Rolex patented and launched a commercially viable waterproof watch, "The Rolex Oyster". Rolex also selected watch dealers in each town to act as exclusive dealers, and provided them with window displays that consisted of an aquarium with plants and goldfish, along with a Rolex Oyster wristwatch. The same strategy was used during the 'Great Exhibition' in London by another brand several decades before. 

Wilsdorf realized the advent of the Rolex Oyster was a major potential of growing income, and invested heavily in advertising. His first Rolex brand ambassador was female swimmer Mercedes Gleitze who swam the English Channel wearing a Rolex Oyster around her neck.

After Mercedes Gleitze, Wilsdorf turned to land speed king Sir Malcolm Campbell to represent Rolex as a brand ambassador. Malcolm Campbell set new land-speed records nine times between 1924 and 1935.

1931: The Rolex Perpetual

In 1931 Rolex launched an automatic wristwatch : "The Rolex Perpetual". The Rolex Perpetual automatically wound itself by harnessing energy captured from the rotation of an internal bi-directional rotor as the wearer moved around.

World War II

By the start of World War II, Royal Air Force pilots were buying Rolex watches to replace their inferior standard-issue watches. When captured and sent to POW camps, their watches were confiscated. When Wilsdorf heard of this, he offered to replace all watches that had been confiscated and not require payment until the end of the war, if the officers would write to Rolex and explain the circumstances of their loss and where they were being held. Wilsdorf personally oversaw this effort.

1945: Hans Wilsdorf Foundation

Wilsdorf and his first wife, Florence Frances May Wilsdorf-Crotty, had no children, and she died from an illness in 1944. In 1945 Wilsdorf established the Hans Wilsdorf Foundation. In 1960 he gave his 100% ownership stake in Rolex to the foundation. The Hans Wilsdorf Foundation owns and controls Rolex to this day, and donates much of its income to charity and social causes in Geneva, Switzerland. There is no requirement to disclose financial or charitable donations under law, and the company pays no corporate taxes as a result of being owned by the Foundation.

1945: The Rolex Datejust

In 1945 Rolex introduced a wristwatch with an aperture window that automatically displayed the date via a date wheel, and was seen on the wrists of world leaders including Sir Winston Churchill and U.S. President Dwight D. Eisenhower.

1946: Founding Tudor

Wilsdorf established the high-quality lower-priced watch brand Tudor, a subsidiary company of Rolex, in 1946. While the Tudor name had appeared on previous watches made under the auspices of Rolex, at this time Tudor expanded into an affordable alternative to Rolex-branded offerings. On March 6, 1946, Wilsdorf made the following statement regarding Tudor:

"For some years now I have been considering the idea of making a watch that our agents could sell at a more modest price than our Rolex watches, and yet one that could attain the standards of dependability for which Rolex is famous, I decided to form a separate company, with the object of making and marketing this new watch. It is called the Tudor Watch Company."

1954: The Rolex Submariner

In 1954 Rolex launched their first specialized diving watch: "The Rolex Submariner". The Submariner became commercially available after introduction at the Basel Fair Show in 1954.

1954: The Rolex GMT-Master

In 1954 Rolex introduced a "tool watch" known as the GMT-Master. The GMT-Master had all the usual Rolex features including a watertight Oyster case, Perpetual movement, and luminous hands and markers, but added a 24-hour hand designed to keep time in a second time zone. The GMT-Master was designed for Pan American Airways pilots, navigators and world travelers.

1955: The Rolex Day-Date

Rolex introduced the Day-Date model in 1955, featuring both a day-of-the-week aperture window and a date aperture window. The Day-Date was somewhat similar to the Rolex Datejust at 36mm in diameter, with a slightly thicker case.

1956: The Rolex Milgauss

The Rolex Milgauss was introduced in 1956 with a Reference Number of 6541. This watch was designed with special anti-magnetic featuring 1000 gauss for scientists who worked in research labs, power plants, or medical facilities whose watches could be affected by magnetism. The original Rolex Milgauss had a second hand similar to a lightning bolt, and resembled the Rolex Submariner.

1960: Death and legacy

Wilsdorf died in Geneva, Switzerland on July 6, 1960. He was buried in Kings Cemetery in Geneva beside his first and second wives. The Hans Wilsdorf Foundation, established in 1945, still owns and controls Rolex.

References

1881 births
1960 deaths
People from Kulmbach
Rolex people
German company founders
20th-century German businesspeople
German emigrants to Switzerland
LVMH people